In algebraic topology, universal coefficient theorems   establish relationships between homology groups (or cohomology groups) with different coefficients. For instance, for every topological space , its integral homology groups:

Here  might be the simplicial homology, or more generally the singular homology: the result itself is a pure piece of homological algebra about chain complexes of free abelian groups. The form of the result is that other coefficients  may be used, at the cost of using a Tor functor.

For example it is common to take  to be , so that coefficients are modulo 2. This becomes straightforward in the absence of 2-torsion in the homology.

Statement of the homology case 
Consider the tensor product of modules . The theorem states there is a short exact sequence involving the Tor functor 

Furthermore, this sequence splits, though not naturally. Here  is the map induced by the bilinear map .

Universal coefficient theorem for cohomology
Let  be a module over a principal ideal domain  (e.g.,  or a field.)

There is also a universal coefficient theorem for cohomology involving the Ext functor, which asserts that there is a natural short exact sequence

As in the homology case, the sequence splits, though not naturally.

In fact, suppose

and define:

Thus, the Eilenberg–MacLane space is a weak right adjoint to the homology functor.

Example: mod 2 cohomology of the real projective space
Let , the real projective space.

Knowing that the integer homology is given by:

We have , so that the above exact sequences yield

In fact the total cohomology ring structure is

Corollaries
A special case of the theorem is computing integral cohomology. For a finite CW complex ,  is finitely generated, and so we have the following decomposition.

One may check that

and

This gives the following statement for integral cohomology:

For  an orientable, closed, and connected -manifold, this corollary coupled with Poincaré duality gives that .

Notes

References
Allen Hatcher, Algebraic Topology, Cambridge University Press, Cambridge, 2002. . A modern, geometrically flavored introduction to algebraic topology. The book is available free in PDF and PostScript formats on the author's homepage.

External links 
Universal coefficient theorem with ring coefficients

Homological algebra
Theorems in algebraic topology